The Lost Woman (Spanish: La mujer perdida) is a 1966 drama film directed by Tulio Demicheli and starring Sara Montiel, Giancarlo Del Duca and Massimo Serato. It was a co-production between France, Italy and Spain.

The film's sets were designed by Enrique Alarcón.

Synopsis 

Sara Fernán escapes from the poor fishing village of her childhood and finds work in a flamenco tavern, a tablao. One day Rafael, a politician with connections, hears her and is so impressed with her performance that he decides to help her advance her musical career. He takes her to Madrid, pays for her singing lessons, and shows her how to dress with taste. In the capital, lifted by his support, she triumphs as a singer. To avoid complicating Rafael's political career, she embarks on a grand tour of Europe.

Created to the greater glory of Sara Montiel, the film was a joint Spanish, French, and Italian production.

Cast 

 Sara Montiel as Sara Fernán  
 Giancarlo Del Duca as Miguel Fabri  
 Massimo Serato as D. Rafael Valcálcer  
 Carmen Bernardos as Ani  
 Christiane Minazzoli as Elena, marquesa de Silva 
 Antonio Ferrandis as Falcón  
 Michel Lemoine as Julio  
 José María Seoane
 María Fernanda Ladrón de Guevara 
 María Isbert as China Pérez  
 Luis Induni 
 Rafael Bardem 
 Carlota Bilbao 
 Xan das Bolas 
 Miguel del Castillo 
 José Orjas as Diputado #2  
 José María Caffarel as Diputado #1  
 Sara Guasch 
 Alfonso del Real as Borracho  
 Manuel Soriano 
 Emilio S. Espinosa
 Juan Cazalilla
 Inma de Santis as Niña

References

Bibliography
 John King & Nissa Torrents. The Garden of Forking Paths: Argentine Cinema. British Film Institute, 1988.

External links 

1966 films
French drama films
Italian drama films
Spanish drama films
1966 drama films
1960s Spanish-language films
Films directed by Tulio Demicheli
1960s Spanish films
1960s Italian films
1960s French films